The Texas Rangers 1995 season involved the Rangers finishing third in the American League west with a record of 74 wins and 70 losses. They also hosted the 1995 Major League Baseball All-Star Game.

Offseason
 October 14, 1994: Rob Ducey was purchased by the Nippon Ham Fighters (Japan Pacific) from the Texas Rangers. 
 December 9, 1994: José Canseco was traded by the Rangers to the Boston Red Sox for Otis Nixon and Luis Ortiz.
 January 26, 1995: Rick Schu was signed as a free agent by the Rangers.

Regular season

Season standings

Record vs. opponents

Notable transactions
 April 13, 1995: Mickey Tettleton was signed as a free agent by the Rangers.
 May 16, 1995: John Dettmer was traded by the Rangers to the Baltimore Orioles for Jack Voigt.
 July 20, 1995: Sam Horn was signed as a free agent by the Rangers.
 July 31, 1995: Danny Darwin was signed as a free agent by the Rangers.
 August 31, 1995: Jack Voigt was traded by the Rangers to the Boston Red Sox for Chris Howard.

All-Star Game

The 1995 Major League Baseball All-Star Game was the 66th playing of the midsummer classic between the all-stars of the American League (AL) and National League (NL), the two leagues comprising Major League Baseball. The game was held on July 11, 1995, at The Ballpark in Arlington in Arlington, Texas, the home of the Texas Rangers of the American League. The game resulted in the National League defeating the American League 3-2.

Roster

Player stats

Batting

Starters by position
Note: Pos = Position; G = Games played; AB = At bats; H = Hits; Avg. = Batting average; HR = Home runs; RBI = Runs batted in

Other batters
Note: G = Games played; AB = At bats; H = Hits; Avg. = Batting average; HR = Home runs; RBI = Runs batted in

Pitching

Starting pitchers 
Note: G = Games pitched; IP = Innings pitched; W = Wins; L = Losses; ERA = Earned run average; SO = Strikeouts

Other pitchers 
Note: G = Games pitched; IP = Innings pitched; W = Wins; L = Losses; ERA = Earned run average; SO = Strikeouts

Relief pitchers 
Note: G = Games pitched; W = Wins; L = Losses; SV = Saves; ERA = Earned run average; SO = Strikeouts

Awards and honors
Iván Rodríguez, C, Gold Glove
Iván Rodríguez, Silver Slugger Award
All-Star Game

Farm system

References

External links
1995 Texas Rangers at Baseball Reference
1995 Texas Rangers at Baseball Almanac

Texas Rangers seasons
Texas Rangers season
Range